Teramoto is a Japanese surname. Notable people with the surname include:

, Japanese Olympic gymnast
, Japanese Lieutenant General
, Japanese Gravure idol and actress
, Japanese actress

See also
Teramoto Station, a railway station in Chita, Aichi Prefecture, Japan

Japanese-language surnames